Columbia Railroad Bridge, also known as "Columbia Bridge", is a 1920 concrete arch bridge in Philadelphia, Pennsylvania, that carries CSX Trenton Subdivision rail lines over the Schuylkill River. Located in Fairmount Park, upstream of the Pennsylvania Railroad Connecting Bridge, it is the third railroad bridge at the site. Near its east abutment are the Schuylkill Grandstand (for viewing rowing regattas) and the John B. Kelly statue.

First bridge
The first bridge at this location was an 1834 covered bridge of white pine and seven spans. It was built by the Commonwealth of Pennsylvania for the Philadelphia & Columbia Railroad, which connected Philadelphia and Columbia in Lancaster County. An inclined plane on the bridge's west side drew the railway cars up Belmont Hill by cable. In 1851, the Philadelphia and Reading Railway bought the bridge from the state.

Second bridge
The second bridge was erected in 1886 by the Philadelphia and Reading Railway to carry increasingly heavy freight traffic. It was a two-track, wrought-iron Pratt truss bridge that served until 1920.

Current bridge
The current bridge was completed in 1920 with two tracks. Two more were added in 1921, but now there are only two tracks on this bridge.

See also
List of crossings of the Schuylkill River
Main Line of Public Works

References

Bridges in Philadelphia
Bridges completed in 1920
Bridges over the Schuylkill River
Railroad bridges in Pennsylvania
Deck arch bridges in the United States
CSX Transportation bridges
Concrete bridges in Pennsylvania